First Baptist Church of Grand Blanc is a historic church at 6101 S. Saginaw Street in Grand Blanc, Michigan. It was built in 1851 and added to the National Register in 1983. It still serves the local Baptist congregation.

History
The First Baptist Church of Grand Blanc was organized in 1833, and held services in the homes or barns of members. Chauncey Gibson a site for the construction of a permanent church, and the church building was completed in 1851. The church recruited its first pastor, Elder Edgar Randall, in 1879. Randall served as pastor until 1911.

Description
The First Baptist Church of Grand Blanc is a rectangular plan gable end structure, three bays wide. The front facade has a central double door entrance flanked with pilasters. and topped by a full entablature. On either side are stained glass windows; more windows line the side facades. The church is  topped with an octagonal belfry.

References

Baptist churches in Michigan
Churches on the National Register of Historic Places in Michigan
Greek Revival church buildings in Michigan
Churches completed in 1851
Buildings and structures in Genesee County, Michigan
1851 establishments in Michigan
National Register of Historic Places in Genesee County, Michigan
Wooden churches in Michigan